Rat Sound Systems is a sound equipment provider of touring sound reinforcement equipment and services to the concert touring industry, based in Camarillo, California.

Rat Sound Systems was established in 1980 by Dave Rat and Brian Benjamin, and is known for being one of the first sound companies to tour with hard core punk bands such as Black Flag, Fear and the Dead Kennedys.

The list of artists and events that Rat Sound Systems has provided equipment for includes: Black Flag, Sonic Youth, Pearl Jam, Red Hot Chili Peppers, Jack Johnson, R.E.M., AFI, Ben Harper, Blink 182, The Offspring, Rage Against the Machine, Weezer, Queens of the Stone Age, Eddie Vedder, My Chemical Romance, Paramore, Jimmy Eat World, Beck, The Used and many other artists.[1][2][3]

The Coachella Valley Music and Arts Festival has utilized Rat Sound to provide audio as the primary audio vendor since 2001.  Warped Tour and Taste of Chaos both tour with sound systems provided by Rat Sound.[4][5]

References

Pro Sound News article "Pearl Jam Votes Rat Sound" 
Pro Sound News article "Rat Sound Supports Red Hot Chili Peppers Benefit" 
FOH Magazine article "Maroon 5 Hits the Road with Rat Sound" 
Pro Sound News article "Coachella Rocks With Rat Sound" 
Mix Magazine article "Rat Continues Coachella Support"

External links
 Rat Sound Systems website
 Dave Rat's tour blog began by documenting his travels with the Red Hot Chili Peppers on their Stadium Arcadium 2006 world tour and has continued the adventures with Blink-182 in 2009

Audio engineering
Sound systems